Oleg Davydov (born 16 March 1971) is a Russian ice hockey player. He competed in the men's tournament at the 1994 Winter Olympics.

Career statistics

Regular season and playoffs

International

References

1971 births
Living people
Soviet ice hockey players
Olympic ice hockey players of Russia
Ice hockey players at the 1994 Winter Olympics
Sportspeople from Chelyabinsk
Traktor Chelyabinsk players
HC Lada Togliatti players